Grilli is a village in Tuscany, central Italy,  administratively a frazione of the comune of Gavorrano, province of Grosseto. At the time of the 2001 census its population amounted to 268.

Grilli is about 25 km from Grosseto and 10 km from Gavorrano, and it is situated in a plain between the hills of Giuncarico, Caldana and Vetulonia. The village was born in the 19th century as an industrial centre related to the mines of Gavorrano.

Main sights 
 Church of Santa Rita da Cascia, main church of the village, it was built in 1969.
 Farm of Lupo (19th century), old estate with a manor house, a chapel, a clock tower, a well and a guard shed (casello idraulico) for the water control.

References

Bibliography

See also 
 Bagno di Gavorrano
 Caldana
 Castellaccia
 Filare
 Giuncarico
 Potassa, Gavorrano
 Ravi, Gavorrano

Frazioni of Gavorrano